The Cornelia White House is a historic 1893 wooden residential structure located in downtown Palm Springs, California, and is one of the oldest surviving structures in the town.

Cornelia White history
The Palmdale Railroad was a horse-drawn narrow gauge short-line railroad in town. It ran along Palm Springs' present-day Farrell Drive to the proposed town site of Palmdale near the foot of Mount San Jacinto. The rail line was short-lived and had been abandoned by 1893 due to lack of water.

The Cornelia White House was built in 1893, and is made entirely of "recycled" railroad ties taken from under the Palmdale Railroad's tracks. The residence is named for its original owner, Cornelia B. White, who was an early pioneer of the Palm Springs area.

McCallum Adobe

The Cornelia White House was built next to the 1884 McCallum Adobe, itself notable as the adobe home of the area's first European American settler, John McCallum, as well as for being the first successful adobe structure in the upper Coachella Valley.

McCallum Adobe-Cornelia White House Museum
Since 1961 the two structures, today known as the McCallum Adobe-Cornelia White House Museum, are directed by and the property of the Palm Springs Historical Society. The historic houses, with other items of local history such as the earliest telephones in Palm Springs, are on display and open to the public to visit at 221 South Palm Canyon Drive, Palm Springs.

See also
 List of heritage railways

References

Further reading
 Francis F. Crocker (1972). The story of Miss Cornelia's little house. Palm Springs, CA: F. Crocker. pp. 34.

External links
 Official Palm Springs Historical Society website
 History of the Cornelia White House
  – With commentary by Frank Bogert; ends at the Moorten Botanical Garden.

Buildings and structures in Palm Springs, California
Tourist attractions in Palm Springs, California
Houses in Riverside County, California
Museums in Riverside County, California
Coachella Valley
Houses completed in 1893
Adobe buildings and structures in California

Historic house museums in California